Alongkorn Prathumwong (born June 28, 1986), simply known as Jack, is a Thai retired professional footballer who plays as a left-back.

External links
 Profile  at Goal

Living people
1986 births
Alongkorn Prathumwong
Alongkorn Prathumwong
Association football fullbacks
Alongkorn Prathumwong
Alongkorn Prathumwong
Alongkorn Prathumwong
Alongkorn Prathumwong